Bohemannia auriciliella is a moth of the family Nepticulidae. It has been recorded from Great Britain, the Netherlands, France and the Czech Republic.

The wingspan is 6-6.8 mm.

The larvae probably feed on birch (Betula species) and lime (Tilia species).

References

External links
 Plant Parasites of Europe
 A Second British Specimen Of Bohemannia auriciliella (Joannis) (=Bradfordi Emmet) (Lepidoptera: Nepticulidae) And Its Possible Host

Nepticulidae
Leaf miners
Moths described in 1908
Moths of Europe
Taxa named by Joseph de Joannis